Collin Oliver (born September 23, 2002) is an American football defensive end who currently plays for the Oklahoma State Cowboys.

Early life and high school
Oliver grew up in Oklahoma City, Oklahoma and attended Edmond Santa Fe High School. He had 66 tackles with 17 tackles for loss, four sacks as a senior. Oliver was rated a four-star recruit and committed to play college football at Oklahoma State over offers from Georgia, Arkansas, Oregon, and Oklahoma.

College career
Oliver was named a starter at defensive end going into his freshman season at Oklahoma State. Oliver was named the Big 12 Conference Defensive Freshman of the Year and second team All-Big 12 after finishing the season with 29 tackles, 15.5 tackles for loss, and 11.5 sacks. He entered his sophomore season on the watchlist for the Bronko Nagurski Trophy.

References

External links
 Oklahoma State Cowboys bio

Living people
American football defensive ends
Players of American football from Oklahoma
Oklahoma State Cowboys football players
2002 births